Pramathanath Chaudhuri (7 August 1868 – 2 September 1946), known as Pramatha Chaudhuri, alias Birbal, was a Bengali writer and an influential figure in Bengali literature. He was the nephew of Rabindranath Tagore as his mother was Sukumari Debi, the second sister of Tagore. He married musician and writer Indira Devi Chaudhurani, daughter of Satyendranath Tagore, the first Indian to have joined the Indian Civil Services and a noted author, composer and feminist of his time, who was also the second eldest brother of Rabindranath Tagore.

Biography

Life at Krishnanagar
He studied in Krishnanagar Debnath High School in Krishnanagar. From his 5th to 13th year, Chaudhuri lived at Krishnanagar, renowned for its own sophisticated speech and wit and craftsmanship of Bharatchardra that made a noteworthy contribution to the growth of literature in Chaudhuri. According to him, 'It (Krishnanagar) gave me speech and shaped my mind' (Atma Katha, An Autobiography). He further asserted: "The moment I arrived at Krishnanagar, objects of visual and sensual delight began to enter into my being. I started an intimate acquaintance with the outer world, appreciating its beauty and growing familiar with sights and sound around me. That was indeed an auspicious introduction to that coveted world which philosophers call the world of aesthetics."

"I started singing when I was very young," stated Chaudhuri in his Atma Katha, "With my naturally sonorous voice I could correctly reproduce the tunes that fell upon my ears." Chaudhuri's love of music derived from his mother and in the cultural atmosphere of Krishnanagar it developed into a passion for him.

During this period, Chaudhuri read in as many as six schools, ranging from Pathshala (traditional Hindu village primary schools in Bengal), through a Christian missionary institution, to the local collegiate school. In 1881, when he was in the Entrance class, malaria broke out in an epidemic form at Krishnanagar. Chaudhuri, a victim of that epidemic, remained unconscious for eight days and later was removed to Arrah, his father's semi-urban official station in Bihar. For the next three months, he put aside his texts and read the novels of Bulwer Lytton, George Eliot and Palgrave's Golden Treasury. In 1882, Chaudhuri returned to Kolkata and passed the Entrance examination from Hare School with first division marks.

Youth
Chaudhuri joined the Presidency College, Kolkata for the First Arts course. But he had to shift to Krishnagar again as there was an outbreak of dengue fever in Kolkata and joined sophomore year Arts class at Krishnagar College. Unfortunately he had to suspend his studies again and moved to his father in Dinajpur owing to persistent fever. Later his elder brother Sir Ashutosh Chaudhuri inspired him to learn French and Chaudhuri became an ardent student of French literature, and also developed an absorbing interest in the Pre-Raphaelite poets. Returning to Kolkata in 1887, he passes the Arts examination from St. Xavier's College, Calcutta with second division marks.

Tagore, who made a selection of his own poems for Kadi O Komal with Ashutosh Chaudhuri's collaboration, was a frequent visitor in the Chaudhuri residence in Mott Lane, Kolkata. Ashutosh was married to Pratibha Devi, a niece of Tagore and Pramatha to Indira Devi, the daughter of Satyendranath Tagore, Rabindranath's elder brother. Chaudhuri later recalled, "The aesthetic envioronment of the Tagore house whetted my appetite for music. To cap it all, there was Rabindranath's personal affection for us." Chaudhuri's wife, later known as Indira Devi Chaudhurani, was a connoisseur of Rabindra Sangeet.

Chaudhuri's attraction to poetry began when he started attending the discussions between his brother and Tagore. In Atma Katha, he later asserted, "Poetry became meaningful to me. Our pursuit of it was promoted by Rabindranath's presence in person. That created an amazing atmosphere in our family."

Chaudhuri returned to Presidency College in 1888 and the following year received the bachelor's degree with first class Honours in philosophy. Then he toured far and wide, visiting many places, including Asansol and Darjeeling in Bengal, Sitarampur in Bihar, Raipur in Madhya Pradesh and during this period he learned Sanskrit and Italian. While in Rajshahi (now in Bangladesh) at Lokendranath Palit's residence, Chaudhuri, along with Tagore and Palit, spent hours discussing the course of literature which was later chronicled in his Panchabhut. He got his M.A. in English from Presidency College, standing first in the first class.

Works
Qualifying for law thereafter, Chaudhuri joined the firm of Ashutosh Dhar, a solicitor, as an article clerk. Chaudhuri sailed for England in 1893 and returned three years after as a Barrister-at-Law, having been called to the bar at/by the Inner Temple. Meanwhile, between, 1890 and 1893, two of his original essays and two stories, Phuldani (The Flower Vase) and Torquato Tasso, were published. Khayal Khata (A Scrap Book) was the first piece that appeared under the pen name Birbal in a Bengali journal Bharati in 1902. He wrote Ek Tukro Smritikatha (A Handful of Reminiscence), in 1908.

With a colloquial style in Bengali Prose and the dominating element of reason and rationality, Chaudhuri as the editor of Sabuj Patra made his first appearance. Around the magazine developed an assembly of authors, a fraternity that regularly gathered in Chaudhuri's Bright Street house.

Later life
Chaudhuri wrote two books of poems, a few collections of short stories and several books of essays. But they made an extensive impact on Bengali literature.

As a Barrister-at-Law, he practiced in Kolkata High Court, but did not take this occupation seriously. For some time he was a lecturer at the Law College, University of Calcutta and also edited a law journal for a period. The closing years of his life he spent at Santiniketan.

Sabuj Patra

Appearance

Sabuj Patra ("Green Leaf"), a liberal and pro-Tagore Bengali magazine edited by Pramatha Chaudhuri, made its debut in April, 1914. In the very first issue, the editor clarified the ideals and objectives of the magazine:

Of the name of the journal, Chaudhuri asserted:

Char-Yari Katha
Char-Yari Katha ('Tales of Four Friends'), published in 1916, is Chaudhuri's magnum opus as a storyteller. A rare presentation and superb implementation, this story depicts Chaudhuri's evident art and artifice. "All the four episodes of it emanate from the world of memory, in some cases factual, and in others factious… A study in depth, however, reveals that Char-Yari Katha weaves a yarn which is neither fact nor fiction."

Criticism
Tales of Four Friends, a translated edition of the story in English by Indira Devi Chaudhurani was thus criticized: "Tales of Four Friends is an Indian attempt to write the counterpart such tales as Mr. Kipling's Without Benefit of Clergy and Pierre Loti's Romantic accounts of exotic amours. We need only add that Mr. Chaudhuri's style is worthy of the high reputation his magazine has own as a record of all that is best in contemporary Bengali literature."

Annada Shankar Ray's comment is suffice to indicate the importance of Char-Yari Katha in Bengali literature, "The eternal aroma of a romantic mind is at the heart of Char-Yari Katha. It is at once pleasant and poignant. Another Char-Yari Katha cannot be had for the asking. One cannot just walk back into youth and folly. Indeed, it is the swan song of second youth longing for the earlier one." (Birbal, 1941)

Bibliography

Non-fiction prose
 1. Tel Nun Lakri, 1906 – Collection of Socio-political Essays.
 2. Birbaler Halkhata, 1917 – Collection of Essays.
 3. Nana Katha, 1919 – Collection of Essays.
 4. Aamaader Shiksha, 1920 – Collection of Essays.
 5. Du-Yarki, 1920 – Collection of Political Essays.
 6. Birbaler Tippani, 1921 – Collection of Short Essays.
 7. Rayater Katha, 1926 – Rayater Katha and other Essays.
 8. Nana Charcha, 1932 – Collection of Essays.
 9. Ghare Baire, 1936 – Collection of Essays.
 10. Prachin Hindusthan, 1940 – Collection of Essays.
 11. Banga-Sahityer Sanskhipta Parichaya, 1944 – Girish Ghosh Lecture, delivered at the instance of the University of Calcutta.
 12. Hindu-Sangeet, 1945 – Collection of Short Notes on Music
 13. Atma-Katha, 1946 – Autobiography
 14. Prabandha Sangraha, Vol.I, 1952 – Collection of Selected Essays.
 15. Prachin Bangla Sahitye Hindu-Musalman, 1953 – A Treatise
 16. Prabandha Sangraha, Vol.II, 1952 – Collection of Selected Essays.

Poetry
 1. Sonnet Panchasat, 1913 – Collection of 50 Sonnets.
 2. Padacharan, 1919 – Collection of Poems.
 3. Sonnet Panchasat and Anyanya Kabita, 1961 – Collection of all Sonnets and Poems.

Fiction
 1. Char-Yari Katha, (Tales of Four Friends), 1916 – Story.
 2. Ahuti,  1919 – Collection of Short Stories.
 3. Nil-Lohit, 1932 – Collection of Stories.
 4. Nil-Lohiter Adi-Prem, 1934 – Collection of Stories.
 5. Ghoshaler Tri-Katha, 1937 – Collection of Stories.
 6. Anukatha-Saptak, 1939 – Collection of Short Stories.
 7. Galpa-Sangraha, 1941 – Collection of Stories.
 8. Galpa-Sangraha, 1968 – Collection of Stories (Revised Enlarged Edition).

Collected works
1. Pramatha Chaudhuri Granthabali, 1926 – Collection of Prose and Poetical Works.

References

Further reading
 Samsad Bangali Charitabhidhan (Biographical Dictionary), ed. by Anjali Bose, Sahitya Samsad, Kolkata. 
 Makers of Indian Literature: Pramatha Chaudhury, Arun Kumar Mukhopadhyay, Sahitya Akademi, New Delhi, 
Quotes By Pramatha Chaudhuri in Bengali , Published online in Bondhu Magazine . Here

Writers from Kolkata
1868 births
1946 deaths
Presidency University, Kolkata alumni
University of Calcutta alumni
Academic staff of the University of Calcutta
Bengali writers
Bengali Hindus
Vangiya Sahitya Parishad
People from Jessore District
Writers from West Bengal